LSP may refer to:

Governance and politics
 Left Socialist Party (Belgium), the Belgian section of the "Committee for a Workers' International"
 Liberal State Party, a former Dutch political party
 Local strategic partnership, a government-inspired body intended to get local government and other bodies operating in its area working together
 Louisiana State Penitentiary
 Louisiana State Police

Science and technology
 Landing Ship, Personnel, World war 2 type ship 
 Language for specific purposes, description of a linguistics field
 Laser shock peening, a surface engineering process used to impart beneficial residual stresses in materials
 Lightest Supersymmetric Particle, generic name given to the lightest of the additional hypothetical particles found in supersymmetric models
 Line spectral pairs (or line spectrum pairs), a kind of digital representation of a filter, used in speech and sound compression
 Linguistic Society of the Philippines
 Localized surface plasmon, a type of surface plasmon excitation in nanoparticles
 Lysergic acid 3-pentyl amide, a psychedelic analogue of LSD with slightly lower binding affinity.

Computing
 Label-switched path, path through an MPLS network
 Language Server Protocol, a JSON protocol for sending requests to language tools to aid a text editor, e.g., for code refactoring
 Layered Service Provider, a part of the protocol stack on the Microsoft Windows operating systems
 Link state packet, packet of information generated by a network router
 Liskov substitution principle, object-oriented programming principle
 Logical Standby Process, a system in Oracle Data Guard data-replication

Space
 Launch Services Program, a NASA program that organizes the launch of spacecraft
 Launch service provider, a company which launches spacecraft

Other uses
 The Last Shadow Puppets, a British musical project by Alex Turner, Miles Kane and James Ford
 Lee Shu Pui Hall, the largest student-hostel in Chung Chi College at the Chinese University of Hong Kong
 Lego Serious Play, consultant service
 Logistics service provider, outsourcing of logistics services to a third party or 3PL
 London School of Philosophy, adult education college in London
 Lumpy Space Princess, a character on the 2010 animated series Adventure Time
 Josefa Camejo International Airport IATA code